Whinfell Beacon is a hill of  in South Lakeland, Cumbria, England, to the east of the Lake District. It is in the far east of the Lake District National Park since the national park's expansion in 2019. It is east of the A6 road and west of the M6 motorway, south of Borrowdale, Westmorland (not the better known Borrowdale in the central lake district) and east of the upper reaches of the River Mint.  
 
There is a cairn and remains of a shelter near the summit, but the highest point is a few metres away on the north east side of the wall across the summit.

It is one of three summits, along with Grayrigg Forest and Winterscleugh, added to the list of Fellrangers in the new edition (2019-2021) of Mark Richards' eight volumes of guidebooks and bringing the total to 230. They were included after the boundary of the Lake District National Park was extended in 2019, adding them to the national park.

References

Fells of the Lake District